was a Japanese classical pianist. At the time of his death he was President of the Tokyo College of Music.

Biography
Minoru Nojima was a child prodigy in Japan, won a major nationwide competition there as a teenager, studied with Lev Oborin in Moscow and then with Constance Keene and Abram Chasins in New York City, and burst upon the international music scene as a second prize winner of the Van Cliburn piano competition in 1969. Although known and highly respected amongst pianists as a "pianist's pianist," he was not well known to most music lovers, largely because he did not like to make recordings and made very few.

In 2007, it was reported that Nojima's 1988 Reference Recordings recording "Nojima Plays Liszt" was one of the recordings plagiarized by Joyce Hatto.
2014 - Received Japan Art Academy Award.

References

External links
Biography

External links
 

1945 births
2022 deaths
21st-century classical pianists
Japanese classical pianists
Japanese male classical pianists
People from Yokosuka, Kanagawa
People from Kanagawa Prefecture
Toho Gakuen School of Music alumni
Moscow Conservatory alumni
Prize-winners of the Van Cliburn International Piano Competition
Academic staff of Toho Gakuen School of Music
Academic staff of Tokyo the College of Music
Presidents of universities and colleges in Japan